The Song of Love (Italian: La canzone dell'amore) is a 1930 Italian romance film directed by Gennaro Righelli and starring Dria Paola, Isa Pola and Elio Steiner. It was the first Italian talking film. Alessandro Blasetti's film Resurrection was actually shot first, but delays meant that it was not released until 1931.

The film was first publicly screened on 7 October 1930 at the Supercinema in Rome. The story was based on a novella by Luigi Pirandello, In Silenzio.

The film was shot at the Cines-Pittaluga studios in Rome in three different versions: Italian, French and German using different casts and directors.

Plot summary

Cast
 Dria Paola as Lucia  
 Isa Pola as Anna  
 Elio Steiner as Enrico  
 Mercedes Brignone as La governante  
 Camillo Pilotto as Alberto Giordani, il padre  
 Olga Capri as La padrona di casa  
 Nello Rocchi as Marietto detto 'Ninì'  
 Umberto Sacripante as Amico di Enrico 
 Geni Sadero as La dirimpettaia  
 Franz Sala 
 Ermete Tamberlani
 Renato Malavasi 
 Gino Mercuriali

References

Bibliography
 Moliterno, Gino. Historical Dictionary of Italian Cinema. Scarecrow Press, 2008.

External links
 
 

1930 films
1930s Italian-language films
1930 romantic drama films
Films based on works by Luigi Pirandello
Films directed by Gennaro Righelli
Films set in Rome
Italian multilingual films
Italian black-and-white films
Films based on short fiction
Cines Studios films
Italian romantic drama films
1930 multilingual films
1930s Italian films